Sadanandante Samayam is a 2003 Malayalam satirical film directed by Akbar-Jose and starring Dileep and Kavya Madhavan. It was a failure at the box office.

Synopsis
The movie is about Sadanandan who is an Ordinary school teacher and people says a good teacher. But some problem are always rotating around him in relation with his life style.

He is a strong believer of astronomy if he does anything, it is according to the law of astronomy. So he could not take a strong decision of his own. He mistrust everything. His life takes a turn when an astrologer informs him that he will soon die. He panics and tries to do everything required for his wife and daughter before he dies.

Cast

 Dileep as Manakkapalli Sadanandan
 Kavya Madhavan as Sumangala / Suma (voice by Praveena)
 Siddique as Sudhakaran, Sadanadan's elder brother 
 Cochin Haneefa as Headmaster Chacko
 Janardhanan as Menon
 Jagathy Sreekumar as Krishnanunni
 Sukumari as Kalyani
 Augustine as Divakaran, Sadanandan's brother-in-law 
 Salim Kumar as Gopalan
 Bindu Panicker as Devootty
 Unnikrishnan Namboothiri as Menon
 T. P. Madhavan as Abdullah Master
 Sadiq as Gopinathan
 Narayanankutty as Bhaskaran
 Machan Varghese as Varghese 
 Jose Pellissery as Vaidyar
 Geetha Salam as Tea-shop owner Saithali
 Reena as Sumangala and Gopinathan's mother
 Ambika Mohan as Nabeeesu
 Maya Vishwanath as Ramani
 Jija Surendran as Teacher
 Gayathri as Gopinathan's wife
 Beena Sabu as Vishukani Janu
 Kalabhavan Shajohn as Beerankutty
 Nivia Rebin as Muslim bride
 Nivedita as Kochammini
 Dimple Rose as Young Devootty
 Meena Ganesh as Vayattatti
 Keerthana Anil as Soumya Mol (voice by Sruthi)

Soundtrack
The film had musical score composed by Mohan Sithara

 Neeyarinjo : K J Yesudas, Sujatha 
Janmanakshathrame :K J Yesudas
Omalale Ente Manassin : K J Yesudas, Sujatha
 Karivala kayyalenne : Vidhu Prathap, Mahadevan

References

External links
 

2000s Malayalam-language films
2003 films
Films scored by Mohan Sithara